Ajnoha is a village in the Hoshiarpur district of Punjab, India. The village is named after Baba Arjan. Baba Arjan a Rajput warrior founded the village.

Geography
Ajnoha is located in the fertile plains of Doaba, Punjab. It is bordered by Bist Doab canal on the East, Nadalon village on the South, and a brook (Choe) on the North.

Demographics
The village of Ajnoha has a population of 2,530 of which 1,287 are males while 1,243 are females as per Population Census 2011.

Literacy rate
The village of Ajnoha has a higher literacy rate compared to Punjab. In 2011, the literacy rate of Ajnoha was 84.49% compared to 75.84% of Punjab. In Ajnoha, the Male literacy rate stands at 89.55% while Female literacy rate is 79.44%.

References

Villages in Hoshiarpur district